RPI Engineers ice hockey may refer to either of the ice hockey teams that represent Rensselaer Polytechnic Institute:

RPI Engineers men's ice hockey
RPI Engineers women's ice hockey